Rupert Oliver Matthews (born 5 December 1961) is a British Conservative Party politician serving as the Leicestershire Police and Crime Commissioner since 2021. He previously served as a Member of the European Parliament (MEP) for the East Midlands from June 2017 until his term ended on 1 July 2019, and has authored books on the paranormal.

Career
Matthews was educated at Esher Grammar School and worked as a freelance writer and journalist. He has written over 170 books on history, ghosts, cryptozoology, UFOs, paranormal activity, guides to the UK and children's stories. Matthews is the editorial director and a shareholder of Bretwalda Books.

Matthews has also run an online course about the paranormal for the International Metaphysical University, on whose website he was described as a 'Professor' until mid-January 2012.

Politics
He served as a councillor for St Mark's ward in Surbiton in Kingston upon Thames, and at the 1997 general election he stood for the Conservatives in the safe Labour constituency of Bootle.

Matthews was selected as a Conservative candidate for the 2009 European Parliament election and was placed third on the Conservative party list for the East Midlands. He was not elected.

On 12 October 2011, Roger Helmer, an MEP for the East Midlands constituency, announced that he would resign from the European Parliament at the end of the year. He expected to be replaced by Matthews, who was in next position on the Conservative party list in the East Midlands. However, after uncertainty was expressed as to whether the party would approve Matthews as the new MEP, Helmer announced he would delay standing down until the position was clarified and Matthews confirmed as his successor. The Conservative Party was reported to be looking into the fact that golliwog dolls featured on the front cover of a book on political correctness published by Bretwalda Books. It was later reported that Matthews was not personally involved in publishing the book. In March 2012, Helmer defected to UKIP and remained an MEP; he was re-elected in 2014.

For the 2014 European Parliament election Matthews was again placed third on the Conservative party list for the East Midlands and, again, missed being elected.

In 2014, Matthews took up a position as National Campaigns Director at Better Off Out. He led Better Off Out's campaign for Britain to leave the European Union, liaising with the official campaign (Vote Leave) as well as with Leave.EU and Grassroots Out. During this time, he supervised the production of leaflets, posters and other campaign materials as well as organising their distribution to the public in the run-up to the 2016 European Union membership referendum.

He finally became an MEP for the East Midlands on 29 June 2017, replacing Andrew Lewer after Lewer was elected to the House of Commons. Matthews was not elected in the 2019 European Parliament election.

He reportedly believed at one time that the Treaty of Lisbon could have enabled the European Commission to invade Britain were the country ever to attempt to leave the European Union, or have enabled the Commission to request a German panzer (tank) division be sent to London were the situation to warrant it.

Matthews was elected in 2021 as Leicestershire Police and Crime Commissioner for the Conservative Party, succeeding the incumbent, The Lord Bach, who was stepping down.

Selected bibliography
Monster Mysteries with Bernard Long (Hove, England: Wayland, 1988 )
The First Settlements with Bernard Long (Hove, England: Wayland, 1990 )
Alien Encounters (Chartwell Books, Inc., 2009 )

References

External links
RupertMatthews.org.uk
Profile at European Parliament website
Rupert Matthews | Conservative Home

1961 births
Living people
People from Epsom and Ewell (district)
English science fiction writers
English writers on paranormal topics
Paranormal investigators
Conservative Party (UK) MEPs
MEPs for England 2014–2019